Dickinson's Bay (also known as Dickenson Bay by some sources) is a bay located in Antigua and Barbuda. Runaway Beach is located on Dickinson's Bay.

References

Bodies of water of Antigua and Barbuda